Forni may refer to:

Geography

United States

Italy
Forni Avoltri, Province of Udine
Forni di Sopra, Province of Udine
Forni di Sotto, Province of Udine
Forni Dolostone, a dolomite geological formation in northeastern Italy

See also
Forni (surname), people surnamed Forni
Forno (disambiguation)